Trinity Christian School is a private, non-denominational Christian school in Morgantown, West Virginia. It was opened during the 2005–06 school year and was created through the merger of CMA Church of Morgantown. It covers K1-12.

During the mid-1990s, parents of students of the former Alliance Christian School were concerned that there no longer remained an option for Christian education beyond middle school in the Morgantown area. The Trinity High School opened for the 1997–1998 school year, taking the 7th and 8th grades from ACS and also allowing students entering 9th grade. Adding one grade each year to retain students, Trinity graduated its first class in 2001.

External links

Christian schools in West Virginia
Educational institutions established in 2005
Private elementary schools in West Virginia
Private high schools in West Virginia
Private middle schools in West Virginia
Buildings and structures in Morgantown, West Virginia
Nondenominational Christian schools in the United States
Schools in Monongalia County, West Virginia
2005 establishments in West Virginia